The Shell Foundation is an initiative of the oil major Royal Dutch Shell, envisioned in 1997, as a worldwide, social investment initiative to concentrate on working with external partners to promote sustainable development. 

In 2000 the Foundation was incorporated as an independent UK-registered charity, with an income stream underpinned by an initial endowment of $250m (£133m) from Shell. The foundation has a Board of seven people: three Shell executives, three non-Shell members from the international development sector, and a non-Shell Chair.

Activities

Shell Foundation supports the creation and scale of social businesses and enabling intermediaries across Sub Saharan Africa and Asia to improve access to essential services that tackle poverty and hardship for people living on $2 to $10 a day. It has two main focus areas: Access to Renewable Energy, covering energy for households, businesses and off-grid communities; and Sustainable Mobility to support low-income communities to better access jobs and essential services.  

Shell Foundation has partnered with The United States Agency for International Development (USAID) and the UK Foreign, Commonwealth and Development Office (FCDO) to improve access to energy across Sub Saharan Africa and Asia in support of the United Nation’s Sustainable Development Goal 7 (Universal Access to Affordable & Clean Energy).

Shell Foundation takes an “enterprise-based approach” to fulfilling its mission, which involves the provision of patient grant-funding and business support to enable pioneers to demonstrate new technologies and models and target scale of impact and financial viability from the outset.

Controversy

On 28 September 2006, an article published in The Guardian newspaper alleged that "An attempt by Shell to portray itself as a model of corporate social responsibility was undermined last night after Whitehall documents showed its charitable arm discussing a key commercial project with a British government minister." The article entitled 
"Campaigners attack Shell’s charity arm over Sakhalin talks" related to The Shell Foundation. The Charity Commission subsequently conducted an inquiry and according to an article published in The Guardian on 17 October 2006, concluded that The Shell Foundation "has fallen short of the good governance and decision-making that we expect from large charities”.

Notes

Conservation and environmental foundations
Shell plc